Stephen Errol Woolman, Lord Woolman,  (born 16 May 1953), is a Scottish legal academic, and a Senator of the College of Justice.

Early life
Woolman was educated at George Heriot's School, Edinburgh and studied law at the University of Aberdeen. He was a lecturer in the Faculty of Law of the University of Edinburgh from 1978 to 1987, serving as Associate Dean from 1981 to 1984. He published the first edition of his work on Contract in 1987, being admitted to the Faculty of Advocates the same year.

Legal career
Woolman served as Standing Junior Counsel to the Office of Fair Trading (1991 to 1995), the Procurement Executive  of the Ministry of Defence (1991 to 1995), and the Inland Revenue (1996 to 1998). He was appointed a Queen's Counsel in 1998 and served as Advocate Depute from 1999 to 2002. He was keeper of the Advocates' Library and a trustee of the National Library of Scotland from 2004 to 2008, and chairman of the Scottish Council of Law Reporting from 2007 to 2008.

He was appointed Senator of the College of Justice, a judge of the High Court of Justiciary and Court of Session, the Supreme Courts of Scotland, in 2008, as Lord Woolman. He sits in the Inner House of the Court of Session. He is also President of the Scottish Tribunals. He was formerly deputy chairman of the Boundary Commission for Scotland (2009 - 2015)

Publications
Woolman on Contract, 1987 (6th ed. 2018) W. Green & Sons.

Personal life
Lord Woolman married Helen Mackinnon in 1977, with whom he has two daughters.

See also
List of Senators of the College of Justice

References

1953 births
Living people
People educated at George Heriot's School
Alumni of the University of Aberdeen
Academics of the University of Edinburgh
Members of the Faculty of Advocates
Scottish King's Counsel
20th-century King's Counsel
Woolman